General elections were held in Dominica on 17 January 1961. The result was a victory for the Dominica Labour Party, which won 7 of the 11 seats. Voter turnout was 76.9%.

Results

References

Dominica
Elections in Dominica
General election
Dominica
January 1961 events in North America